Humbertus Knoch or better known as Barry Prima (born 19 August 1954) is an Indonesian actor and martial artist of mixed Dutch and Sundanese who was one of the biggest stars of Indonesian cinema during the 1980s.

Filmography
The following is a partial filmography (Prima has appeared in over 60 movies).
Realita, Cinta dan Rock'n Roll a.k.a. Reality, Love, and Rock'N Roll (2006)
Janji Joni a.k.a. Joni's Promise (2005)
Menumpas Teroris a.k.a. Fighting Terrorists (1986)
The Warrior and the Ninja (1985)
 (1984)
The Devil's Sword (1984)
The Warrior Against Blind Swordsman (Si Buta Lawan Jaka Sembung) (1983)
Perempuan Bergairah (1982)
Srigala (1981)
The Warrior (Jaka Sembung) (1981)
Primitif (1978)

Awards and nominations

References

External links

The Devil's Sword review at Internal Bleeding
Ferocious Female Freedom Fighters review at Internal Bleeding

1955 births
Male actors from West Java
Indo people
Sundanese people
Indonesian male film actors
Indonesian people of Dutch descent
Living people
People from Bandung
Silat practitioners
Indonesian taekwondo practitioners